Legacy is a 2012 Philippine television drama series broadcast by GMA Network. Directed by Jay Altarejos and Andoy Ranay, it stars Heart Evangelista and Lovi Poe. It premiered on January 16, 2012 on the network's Telebabad line up replacing Amaya. The series concluded on June 1, 2012 with a total of 98 episodes. It was replaced by Makapiling Kang Muli in its timeslot.

The series is streaming online on YouTube.

Cast and characters

Lead cast
 Heart Evangelista as Diana Calcetas
 Lovi Poe as Natasha Alcantara

Supporting cast
 Geoff Eigenmann as Joshua "Josh" Castillo
 Sid Lucero as Iñigo Salcedo
 Alessandra de Rossi as Bernadette Leviste
 Mike Tan as Arturo "Third" San Jose III
 Eddie Garcia as Romualdo Alcantara
 Liza Lorena as Sofia Altamirano
 Jackie Lou Blanco as Isabel Calcetas-Aragon
 Maritoni Fernandez as Anna Marie Leviste
 Cherie Gil as Eva Altamirano-Alcantara
 Mark Bautista as Eboy
 Solenn Heussaff as Chloe Martin
 Sam Pinto as Ciara Estuar
 Ryza Cenon as Juliet
 Chariz Solomon as Candy

Guest cast
 Robert Seña as Cesar Alcantara
 Maria Isabel Lopez as Lala Salcedo
 Dennis Trillo as young Cesar Alcantara
 Chynna Ortaleza as young Eva Altamirano-Alcantara
 Bianca King as young Isabel Calcetas-Aragon
 Sue Prado as young Sofia Altamirano
 Isabel Nesreen Frial as young Diana Calcetas
 Bon Vibar as Arturo San Jose Sr.
 Richard Quan as Lucio Aragon
 Dominic Roco as young Lucio Aragon
 Lloyd Samartino as Rowell
 Benedict Campos as young Rowell
 Arthur Solinap as Quintin
 Bodie Cruz as Franco
 Bubbles Paraiso as Marie
 Carla Abellana as herself
 Carlo Gonzales as Gary
 Daisy Reyes as Maridess
 Gian Magdangal as himself
 Jona as herself
 Aicelle Santos as herself
 Maricris Garcia as herself
 Shamaine Centenera-Buencamino as Lydia
 Tom Olivar as Rogelio
 Tim Yap as Justin
 Victor Aliwalas as Von

Reception

Ratings
According to AGB Nielsen Philippines' Mega Manila household television ratings, the pilot episode of Legacy earned a 23.4% rating. While the final episode scored a 28.4% rating.

Critical response
The show gathered positive feedbacks from critics for its visual style and acting of its cast. Eddison Miranda of Rogue Magazine Philippines, stated "I love how the villains play an effective role but having to blend with a comedic outcome". Miranda also highlighted the performance of Maritoni Fernandez and Cherie Gil.

Accolades

References

External links
 

2012 Philippine television series debuts
2012 Philippine television series endings
Filipino-language television shows
GMA Network drama series
Television shows set in the Philippines